Ji-soo, also spelled Ji-su, Jee-su, or Jee-soo, is a Korean unisex given name. Its meaning differs based on the hanja used to write each syllable of the name. There are 46 hanja with the reading "ji" and 67 hanja with the reading "soo" on the South Korean government's official list of hanja which may be registered for use in given names.

Entertainers
Kim Ji-soo (actress) (born Yang Sung-yoon, 1972), South Korean actress
Seo Ji-soo (born 1985), South Korean female professional StarCraft player
Shin Ji-soo (born 1985), South Korean actress
Park Ji-soo (actress) (born 1988), South Korean actress
Kim Ji-soo (singer, born 1990), South Korean male singer
Jisu Park (born 1990), South Korean male professional StarCraft player
Ji Soo (born Kim Ji-soo, 1993), South Korean actor
Jisoo (born Kim Ji-soo, 1995), South Korean singer and actress, member of Blackpink

Sportspeople
Mo Ji-soo (born 1969), South Korean male short track speed skater
Hwang Ji-soo (born 1981), South Korean male football midfielder (K League Classic)
Jisoo Han (born 1983), South Korean female diving instructor in Honduras
Jeon Ji-soo (born 1985), South Korean female short track speed skater
Kim Ji-soo (baseball) (born 1986), South Korean male baseball player
Jung Ji-soo (born 1990), South Korean male football striker (Thai Division 1 League)
Yoon Ji-su (born 1993), South Korean female fencer
Kim Ji-soo (skeleton racer) (born 1994), South Korean male skeleton racer
Park Ji-soo (footballer) (born 1994), South Korean male football centre back (K League Challenge)
Park Ji-su (born 1998), South Korean female basketball player

See also
List of Korean given names

References

Korean unisex given names